Philippe Monfils (born 1939) is a Belgian politician and a member of the MR. He was elected as a member of the Belgian Senate in 2007.

Honours 
 1999 : Grand Officer in the Order of Leopold.
 2007 : Knight Grand Cross in the Order of Leopold II.

Notes

1939 births
Living people
Belgian Ministers of State
Politicians from Liège
Members of the Senate (Belgium)
MEPs for Belgium 1994–1999
Mouvement Réformateur MEPs
21st-century Belgian politicians
Walloon movement activists
Recipients of the Grand Cross of the Order of Leopold II
Ministers-President of the French Community of Belgium